The R714 is a Regional Route in South Africa.

Route
The R714 begins at a T-junction with the R26 in Bethlehem (north-east of the town centre). From Bethlehem, it runs east-north-east for 34.7 km to reach a junction with the R57. It continues east-north-east for another 42 km to reach its end in the town of Warden at a junction with the N3.

References 

Regional Routes in the Free State (province)